Sarcina ventriculi is a bacterium from the family of Clostridiaceae. 
Phylogenetics have placed S. ventriculi and Sarcina maxima within the genus Clostridium. It has been proposed to be renamed to Clostridium ventriculi in 2016, but ultimately retained its name due to the genus name of Sarcina taking priority over Clostridium.

References

Bacteria described in 1842
Clostridiaceae